The Herøy Bridge is a cantilever bridge that connects the islands of Gurskøya and Leinøya in the municipality of Herøy in Møre og Romsdal county, Norway. It is part of a bridge network which connects all of the main islands of the municipality together.

Herøy Bridge was opened by King Olav V on 4 September 1976.

See also
Remøy Bridge
Runde Bridge
Nerlandsøy Bridge
List of bridges in Norway
List of bridges in Norway by length
List of bridges
List of longest bridges in the world

References

External links
Road Viaducts & Bridges in Norway

Sunnmøre
Herøy, Møre og Romsdal
Bridges in Møre og Romsdal
Bridges completed in 1976
Cantilever bridges
1976 establishments in Norway